Yunus Emre Tunnel, is a highway tunnel constructed in Ordu Province, northern Turkey.

Yunus Emre Tunnel is part of the Samsun-Ordu Highway   within the Black Sea Coastal Highway, of which construction was carried out by the Turkish S.T.Y. Construction Company. The -long twin-tube tunnel carrying two lanes of traffic in each direction. The Bayramca Tunnel follows the Yunus Emre Tunnel in direction Ordu.

The tunnel was opened to traffic on December 21, 2013 by Turkish Prime Minister Recep Tayyip Erdoğan.

References

External links
 Map of road tunnels in Turkey at General Directorate of Highways (Turkey) (KGM)

Road tunnels in Turkey
Transport in Ordu Province
Tunnels completed in 2013